The Mediterranean Cup is a darts tournament that has been held since 1971. The participating countries are: Cyprus, France, Gibraltar, Greece, Italy, Malta, Catalonia, Spain & Turkey. On first editions the host nation supplies 2 teams to make even numbers. Teams consist of 4 men & 2 woman players. Matches are played as Men's Team Event, Men's Pairs & Men's Singles and Ladies Team event & Ladies Singles. Points are awarded to each nation depending on individual and team performances, with overall Gold going to the nation with most points.

List of winners (Men's Singles)

Youth winners

References

External links

Darts tournaments
1971 establishments in Europe
Recurring sporting events established in 1971